Saperda lateralis is a species of beetle in the family Cerambycidae. It was described by Johan Christian Fabricius in 1775. It is known from Canada and the United States.

Varietas
 Saperda lateralis var. connecta Felt & Joutel, 1904
 Saperda lateralis var. abbreviata Fitch, 1858
 Saperda lateralis var. transeuns Breuning, 1952
 Saperda lateralis var. suturalis Fitch, 1858

References

lateralis
Beetles described in 1775
Taxa named by Johan Christian Fabricius